Mario Hernández Calderón (born October 20, 1957) is a Mexican football manager and former player.

References

Living people
1957 births
Mexican footballers
Association football defenders
Club Atlético Zacatepec players
Atlante F.C. footballers
Tampico Madero F.C. footballers
Tigres UANL footballers
Liga MX players
Mexican football managers